Reed Station is an unincorporated community in Mount Pleasant Township, Delaware County, Indiana.

History
The first post office at Reed Station was established in 1876. William Reed was postmaster.

Geography

References

Unincorporated communities in Delaware County, Indiana
Unincorporated communities in Indiana